The Latvian Song and Dance Festival is one of the largest amateur choral and dancing events in the world and an important event in Latvian culture and social life.

As one of the Baltic song festivals, it is also a part of the UNESCO Masterpieces of the Oral and Intangible Heritage of Humanity list since 2008.

The All-Latvian Song Festival has been held since 1873, normally every five years, with the Latvian Dance Festival component added in 1948. During the festivals exhibitions of photography, art and folk craft, orchestra concerts, and a festive parade also take place.

Events and competitions leading up to the event occur throughout the period between festivals. Additional festivals were held in 2001 and 2011, both on major anniversaries of the founding of Riga.

Approximately 40,000 performers altogether participate in the event. Folk songs and classical choir songs are sung, with emphasis on a cappella singing, though modern popular songs have recently been incorporated into the repertoire as well.

Since 1960, a distinct  has been held in an alternate five-year cycle, on a matching scale.

History
The tradition of song festivals originated in the first half of the 19th century in many European countries and later was also organized by the Baltic Germans. The first steps taken in the Latvian environment was during the Song days in Dikļi in 1864, which led to the resounding of a full-scale song festival in Riga during the summer of 1873. 1,003 singers and 30 orchestra players participated in the first festival. Only once has the festival been held outside Riga, in Jelgava in 1895.

After the Soviet occupation of Latvia in 1940 and World War II, festivals were continued in the Latvian SSR, heavily influenced by Soviet ideology and used to praise the occupation regime, with the festival being held every 5 years on important anniversaries of the nation's forced accession as a Union Republic, while the festival was held in 1973 to mark its centennial anniversary and in 1977 to mark the diamond jubilee of the October Revolution, both events connected to the centennial commemorations of The First Latvian National Awakening.

During the occupation the festival tradition was continued in exile, first in displaced persons camps after World War II, primarily in the western zones in Germany, then in the United States, Canada, and Australia, with many of the legendary conductors of the past taking part during those years alongside the later generations of conductors they trained. The Overseas Song and Dance Festival is currently held every four years, alternating between the United States and Canada.

The song, which speaks about the rebirth of a free Latvian nation, was and is usually a staple of the festival's song list and was not performed thrice in its history (1960, 1965 and 1977), and had been performed in the 1980 edition in the presence of Annija Vītola, widow of the song's composer Jāzeps Vītols, marking 80 years since it was first performed.

The 24th Festival was held in July 2008. The main events were held at the Mežaparks Great Bandstand and the Daugava Stadium in Riga. The 25th Festival took place in July 2013.

81,309 of the 95,250 available tickets for the 26th Festival's various events were sold on the first day. The festival took place from 1–8 July 2018, marking the 100th anniversary of Latvian independence, encompassing 65 events with a total of 500,000 expected visitors.

The closing concert, in which a choir of 16,000 singers and other participants performed, and the subsequent sing-along night was attended by more than 67 thousand people, making it the highest attendance to an event in the festival's history.

The 27th edition will be held in July 2023, marking the festival's sesquicentennial jubilee anniversary.

See also
Estonian Song Festival
Lithuanian Song Festival

References

External links

Latvian Nationwide Song and Dance Celebration.
Latvian Song and Dance Festival at the Latvian National Encyclopedia 
Latvian Song and Dance Festival repository 
Song and Dance Celebration Law. likumi.lv
 When Many Become One

Music festivals in Latvia
Recurring events established in 1873
Folk festivals in Latvia
Music festivals established in 1873
Classical music festivals in Latvia
Choral festivals
1873 establishments in the Russian Empire